The Patterson–Crane Award, previously the  Austin M. Patterson Award, is an award for contributions to chemical information. It is awarded every two years, in odd-numbered years, and sponsored by the Columbus and Dayton sections of the American Chemical Society but not restricted to members of the ACS.

The Austin M. Patterson award was established in 1949 and its first recipient was Austin M. Patterson, in recognition of his work on chemical nomenclature and as editor of Chemical Abstracts.  In 1975 the award was renamed to commemorate also E. J. Crane, who edited Chemical Abstracts 1915–1958, and who had received the award in 1953.

Winners of the award
Source: American Chemical Society
1949 –  Austin M. Patterson
1951 – Arthur B. Lamb
1953 – E. J. Crane
1955 – Howard S. Nutting
1957 – Melvin G. Mellon
1959 – Leonard T. Capell
1961 – G. Malcolm Dyson
1963 – W. Albert Noyes Jr.
1965 – Elmer Hockett
1967 – Melville L. Wolfrom
1969 – Herman Skolnik
1971 – Charles D. Hurd
1973 – Pieter E. Verkade
1975 – William J. Wiswesser
1977 – Benjamin H. Weil
1979 – Dale B. Baker
1981 – W. Conard Fernelius
1983 – Eugene Garfield
1985 – Bruno J. Zwolinski
1987 – Kurt L. Loening
1989 – George E. Vladutz
1991 – David R. Lide, Jr.
1993 – Hideaki Chihara
1995 – Arthur E. Martell
1997 – Derek Horton
1999 – Stephen E. Stein
2001 – Gerard P. Moss
2003 – Robert J. Massie
2005 – Gilles Klopman
2007 – Gary D. Wiggins
2010 – Peter Willett
2015 – Stephen Heller
2018 – Paul Weiss

See also 

 List of computer science awards
 List of chemistry awards
 List of prizes named after people

References

Information science awards
Awards established in 1949
Awards of the American Chemical Society
Science and technology in Ohio